Gudrun Schröfel (born 1 February 1943) is a German choral conductor, conductor and academic teacher. She led choirs, namely the Mädchenchor Hannover, to competition successes and awards for recordings.

Life 
Schröfel studied music pedagogy, conducting, voice and voice pedagogy at the Musikhochschule Hannover. She studied further with Eric Ericson and Arleen Augér.

She was appointed professor of music pedagogy, with a focus on conducting choirs and ensembles, at the Folkwang Hochschule in Essen in 1985. She moved to the Hochschule für Musik, Theater und Medien Hannover where she also served as vice president for thirteen years, until her retirement in 2012.

She was conductor and artistic director of the Mädchenchor Hannover from 1999, succeeding Ludwig Rutt. She has been leader of the Johannes-Brahms-Chor Hannover, a mixed chamber choir, from 2001. She initiated the composition of music for choirs of limited voice range (gleichstimmige Chöre).

The Johannes Brahms Chor won the Deutscher Chorwettbewerb with her conducting. In 2010, both choirs received the ECHO Klassik together with six other choirs from Hannover.

She was awarded the Niedersächsischer Musikpreis in 1989, and received the Lower Saxony Order of Merit in 2004. She has made more than 20 recordings.

References

External links 

Women conductors (music)
20th-century German conductors (music)
21st-century German conductors (music)
German choral conductors
Hochschule für Musik, Theater und Medien Hannover alumni
Academic staff of the Folkwang University of the Arts
Academic staff of the Hochschule für Musik, Theater und Medien Hannover
1943 births
Living people